Zhao Yiqin (born 31 May 1997) is a Chinese actor.

Early life and education
Zhao Yi Qin was born on May 31, 1997 in Jining, Shandong, China. He is currently studying at Communication University of China.

Career
In 2016, Zhao signed a contract with Huanyu Film, an entertainment company owned by Yu Zheng, and entered the entertainment industry. He was then cast in the crime drama Memory Lost. The same year he was cast in the historical fantasy television series, Zhaoge.

Zhao gained recognition with his supporting roles in the historical comedy drama King is Not Easy, and romantic comedy drama Accidentally In Love; as well as historical fiction TV series The Legend of Haolan where he plays Prince Yi of Zhao. 

In 2019, Zhao starred in the youth drama Salute to My Youth as his first leading role. He received positive reviews and experienced a rise in popularity. 

In 2020, Zhao starred in the historical romance drama Fake Princess. The same year, he starred in romance comedy drama My Girl, palace romance drama Love Story of Court Enemies, and youth suspense drama Consummation.

Filmography

Film

Television series

References

Chinese male television actors
21st-century Chinese male actors
1997 births
Living people
Male actors from Shandong
Communication University of China alumni